The 1959–60 NCAA men's ice hockey season began in November 1959 and concluded with the 1960 NCAA Men's Ice Hockey Tournament's championship game on March 19, 1960 at the Boston Arena in Boston, Massachusetts. This was the 13th season in which an NCAA ice hockey championship was held and is the 66th year overall where an NCAA school fielded a team.

This was the first season of play for the WCHA. All seven universities were the same from the previous MCHL/WIHL conference that dissolved after the 1957–58 season. Michigan, Michigan State and Minnesota would continue with both the Big Ten and the WCHA concurrently until 1981 when Michigan and Michigan State left the WCHA and no longer played sufficient games against the other Big Ten schools to warrant the continuation of the Big Ten ice hockey conference.

The creation of the WCHA also brought the first formalized conference tournament in NCAA hockey history with the winner(s) receiving the first automatic bids into the postseason championship.

Regular season

Season tournaments

Standings

1960 NCAA Tournament

Note: * denotes overtime period(s)

Player stats

Scoring leaders
The following players led the league in points at the conclusion of the season.

GP = Games played; G = Goals; A = Assists; Pts = Points; PIM = Penalty minutes

Leading goaltenders
The following goaltenders led the league in goals against average at the end of the regular season while playing at least 33% of their team's total minutes.

GP = Games played; Min = Minutes played; W = Wins; L = Losses; OT = Overtime/shootout losses; GA = Goals against; SO = Shutouts; SV% = Save percentage; GAA = Goals against average

Awards

NCAA

WCHA

References

External links
College Hockey Historical Archives
1959–60 NCAA Standings

 
NCAA